Loxopholis ferreirai is a species of lizard in the family Gymnophthalmidae. The species is endemic to Brazil.

Etymology
The specific name, ferreirai, is in honor of Portuguese naturalist Alexandre Rodrigues Ferreira.

Geographic range
L. ferreirai is found in the Brazilian state of Amazonas.

Habitat
The preferred natural habitat of L. ferreirai is forest.

Reproduction
L. ferreirai is oviparous, and it does not reproduce by parthenogenesis.

References

Further reading
Goicoechea N, Frost DR, De la Riva I, Pellegrino KCM, Sites J Jr, Rodrigues MT, Padial JM (2016). "Molecular systematics of teioid lizards (Teioidea/Gymnophthalmoidea: Squamata) based on the analysis of 48 loci under tree-alignment and similarity-alignment". Cladistics 32 (6): 624–671. (Loxopholis ferreirai, new combination, p. 670).
Marques-Souza S, de Sena MA, Ferreira GC, Rodrigues MT, Brunes TO (2020). "Natural history notes and range extension of Loxopholis ferreirai (Rodrigues and Avila-Pires, 2005): a micro-endemic species from the flooded igapó forests of Rio Negro and tributaries, Brazilian Amazonia (Squamata: Gymnophthalmidae)". Herpetology Notes 13: 235–239.
Ribeiro-Júnior MA, Amaral S (2016). "Diversity, distribution, and conservation of lizards (Reptilia: Squamata) in the Brazilian Amazonia". Neotropical Diversity 2 (1): 195–421. (Leposoma ferreirai).
Ribeiro-Júnior MA, Amaral S (2017). "Catalogue of distribution of lizards (Reptilia: Squamata) from the Brazilian Amazonia". IV. Alopoglossidae, Gymnophthalmidae". Zootaxa 4269 (2): 151–196.
Rodrigues MT, Ávila-Pires TCS (2005). "New Lizard of the Genus Leposoma (Squamata, Gymnophthalmidae) from the Lower Rio Negro, Amazonas, Brazil". Journal of Herpetology 39 (4): 541–546. (Leposoma ferreirai, new species).

Loxopholis
Reptiles of Brazil
Endemic fauna of Brazil
Reptiles described in 2005
Taxa named by Miguel Trefaut Rodrigues
Taxa named by Teresa C.S. Ávila-Pires